St. Peter's Episcopal Church is located in McKinney, Texas, approximately 30 miles north of Dallas.

The church was designated a mission church in 1876, when services were held in private homes and offices. In 1890 the mission was elevated to the status of a parish, and in 1893 the original frame church was completed, on the site of the present church. A new sanctuary was built in 1926.

In 1960 a fire destroyed the sanctuary and other valuables, and the current church building was built the next year, and extended in 1997.

The church's Rector is the Rev. Perry E. Mullins.

See also 

Anglican Communion
Episcopal Church in the United States of America
Episcopal Diocese of Dallas

External links
Official website
Episcopal Church of the USA
Anglican Communion
Episcopal Diocese of Dallas

Buildings and structures in Collin County, Texas
Episcopal churches in Texas
McKinney, Texas